A bite indicator is a mechanical or electronic device which indicates to an angler that something is happening at the hook end of the fishing line.

Types 

There are many types of bite indicators. Which ones work best depends on the type of fishing.

 Fishing floats: widely used as bite indicators. Fishing floats are usually "cocked" by different split shot weights so that just the brightly coloured tip of the float is showing above the water surface.
 Fishing bells: a bulldog clip attached to a pair of small jingle bells. When clipped onto the fishing rod, any vibrations transmitted from the fishing line will cause the bell to rattle, giving off alerting sounds that the angler can hear.
 Quiver tips: attached onto the end of the fishing rod. These can be screw in or push in and come in different weights of test curve for sensitivity and application, such as river and stillwater use.
 Swing Tip: similar to quiver tips but hang off the tip of the rod and pull up into a horizontal position during a bite. These are usually screw in and are not as common as quiver tips.
 Bite alarms: electronic devices which bleep when a fish tugs a fishing line. The fishing line is wound on a running roller which makes a noise when the fishing line moves, thus alerting the angler that a fish might be hooked. They are attached to the fishing rod between the reel and the first eye on the rod, and give an audible alert when there is a simple movement of the line. Bite alarms can range from simple devices with an on/off switch that do no more than indicate when the line moves over the roller, to more sophisticated devices with volume, tone and sensitivity controls. They are useful when fishing with more than one rod, and are commonly used when coarse fishing for carp. Whereas floats can be used as visual bite detectors, bite alarms are audible bite detectors.  Although more expensive than visual devices, audible devices are popular as they do not require constant monitoring. They were invented by Richard Walker.

Notes

External links
 Fishing Bite Alarms

Fishing equipment